Anatoly Starushchenko (born 14 January 1988) is a Ukrainian footballer playing with FC Continentals in the Canadian Soccer League.

Playing career

Europe and Asia 
Starushchenko started playing football in second grade. Starushchenko signed with Illichivets Mariupol in 2005 but featured in the Ukrainian Second League with FC Illichivets-2 Mariupol. He resumed playing in the third tier in 2008 with Yednist' Plysky. In 2010, he played in the Ukrainian First League with FC Tytan Armyansk where he appeared in one match.

The following season he played abroad in the Tajik League with CSKA Pamir Dushanbe after a failed trial with Dacia Chisinau in Moldova. After two seasons in Dushanbe, he was transferred to league rivals Khayr Vahdat where he spent two seasons. In 2015, he returned to his former club CSKA Pamir where he played for three seasons. After several seasons abroad in Asia he returned to the Ukrainian First League in 2017 in order to play with PFC Sumy. After a season with Sumy, he signed with FC Podillya Khmelnytskyi.

Canada 
In 2019, he went abroad once more to play in the Canadian Soccer League with FC Vorkuta. In his debut season with Vorkuta, he assisted in securing the First Division title. He re-signed with Vorkuta for the 2020 season. He featured in the CSL Championship final against Scarborough SC and assisted in securing the championship. In his third season with Vorkuta, he assisted in securing Vorkuta's third regular-season title and secured the ProSound Cup against Scarborough. He also played in the 2021 playoffs where Vorkuta was defeated by Scarborough in the championship final. 

In 2022, Vorkuta was renamed FC Continentals and Starushchenko was re-signed for his fourth season. Throughout the season, he helped Continentals secure a playoff berth by finishing fourth in the standings. He made his third consecutive championship final appearance against Scarborough once more where he won his second championship title.

Honors 
FC Vorkuta

 CSL Championship: 2020, 2022
 Canadian Soccer League First Division/Regular Season: 2019, 2021 
ProSound Cup: 2021

References 

1988 births
Living people
Ukrainian footballers
FC Illichivets-2 Mariupol players
FC Yednist Plysky players
FC Tytan Armyansk players
CSKA Pamir Dushanbe players
PFC Sumy players
FC Podillya Khmelnytskyi players
FC Continentals players
Ukrainian First League players
Tajikistan Higher League players
Canadian Soccer League (1998–present) players
Association football goalkeepers
Expatriate soccer players in Canada
Ukrainian expatriate footballers
Ukrainian expatriate sportspeople in Canada
Ukrainian Second League players
Sportspeople from Mariupol